Jamie Lever is an Indian actress and comedian who works in Hindi films and television. She is the daughter of comedian Johnny Lever.

Early life and education
Lever is the daughter of the comedian Johnny Lever (John Prakash Rao Janumala) and Sujata Janumala. She has a younger brother, Jesse. Lever received her Master of Marketing Communications degree from University of Westminster, London.

Career
Lever began her career in August 2012 as a marketing executive at the London-based market research agency Visiongain. She has performed at The Comedy Store, Mumbai from 2012 as a stand-up comedienne. She performed on Comedy Circus Ke Mahabali on Sony Entertainment Television in 2013. Lever has also hosted various shows.

Filmography

Films

Music videos

References

External links
 

Telugu people
Living people
Indian film actresses
Actresses in Hindi cinema
Indian Christians
Indian stand-up comedians
1987 births